Pinnipedimorpha is a stem-clade of arctoid carnivorans that is defined to include the last common ancestor of Phoca and Enaliarctos, and all of their descendants of that ancestral taxon. Scientists still debate on which lineage of arctoid carnivorans are the closest relatives to the pinnipedimorphs, being more closely related to musteloids.

Below is an overall phylogeny of the taxa covered in the article followed after a composite tree in Berta et al. (2018) and a total-evidence (combined molecular-morphological) dataset in Paterson et al. (2020):

See also 
 List of fossil pinnipeds

References

Further reading 
 A. Berta, C. E. Ray, and A. R. Wyss. 1989. Skeleton of the oldest known pinniped, Enaliarctos mealsi. Science 244:60-62

Prehistoric pinnipeds